Leonard Raymond Delfs (4 May 1920 – 8 April 1973) was an  Australian rules footballer who played with South Melbourne in the Victorian Football League (VFL).

Notes

External links 

1920 births
1973 deaths
Australian rules footballers from Western Australia
Sydney Swans players
South Fremantle Football Club players